The Water-Babies, A Fairy Tale for a Land Baby is a children's novel by Charles Kingsley. Written in 1862–1863 as a serial for Macmillan's Magazine, it was first published in its entirety in 1863. It was written as part satire in support of Charles Darwin's On The Origin of Species. The book was extremely popular in the United Kingdom and was a mainstay of British children's literature for many decades, but eventually fell out of favour in America in part due to its claimed prejudices against Irish, Jews, Catholics, and Americans.

Story
The protagonist is Tom, a young chimney sweep, who falls into a river after encountering an upper-class girl named Ellie and being chased out of her house. There he appears to drown and is transformed into a "water-baby", as he is told by a caddisfly — an insect that sheds its skin — and begins his moral education. The story is thematically concerned with Christian redemption, though Kingsley also uses the book to argue that England treats its poor badly, and to question child labour, among other themes.

Tom embarks on a series of adventures and lessons, and enjoys the community of other water-babies on Saint Brendan's Island once he proves himself a moral creature. The major spiritual leaders in his new world are the fairies Mrs. Doasyouwouldbedoneby (a reference to the Golden Rule), Mrs. Bedonebyasyoudid, and Mother Carey. Weekly, Tom is allowed the company of Ellie, who became a water-baby after he did.

Grimes, his old master, drowns as well, and in his final adventure, Tom travels to the end of the world to attempt to help the man where he is being punished for his misdeeds. Tom helps Grimes to find repentance, and Grimes will be given a second chance if he can successfully perform a final penance. By proving his willingness to do things he does not like, if they are the right things to do, Tom earns himself a return to human form, and becomes "a great man of science" who "can plan railways, and steam-engines, and electric telegraphs, and rifled guns, and so forth". He and Ellie are united, although the book states (perhaps jokingly) that they never marry, claiming that in fairy tales, no one beneath the rank of prince and princess ever marries.

The book ends with the caveat that it is only a fairy tale, and the reader is to believe none of it, "even if it is true".

Interpretation
In the style of Victorian-era novels, The Water-Babies is a didactic moral fable. In it, Kingsley expresses many of the common prejudices of that time period, and the book includes dismissive or insulting references to Americans,
Jews,
Blacks,
and Catholics,
particularly the Irish.

The book had been intended in part as a satire, a tract against child labour, as well as a serious critique of the closed-minded approaches of many scientists of the day in their response to Charles Darwin's ideas on evolution, which Kingsley had been one of the first to praise. He had been sent an advance review copy of On the Origin of Species, and wrote in his response of 18 November 1859 (four days before Darwin’s book was published) that he had "long since, from watching the crossing of domesticated animals and plants, learnt to disbelieve the dogma of the permanence of species," and had "gradually learnt to see that it is just as noble a conception of Deity, to believe that He created primal forms capable of self development into all forms needful pro tempore and pro loco, as to believe that He required a fresh act of intervention to supply the lacunas which He Himself had made", asking "whether the former be not the loftier thought."

In the book, for example, Kingsley argues that no person is qualified to say that something that they have never seen (like a human soul or a water baby) does not exist.

How do you know that? Have you been there to see? And if you had been there to see, and had seen none, that would not prove that there were none ... And no one has a right to say that no water babies exist till they have seen no water babies existing, which is quite a different thing, mind, from not seeing water babies.

In his Origin of Species, Darwin mentions that, like many others at the time, he thought that changed habits produce an inherited effect, a concept now known as Lamarckism.  In The Water Babies, Kingsley tells of a group of humans called the Doasyoulikes who are allowed to do "whatever they like" and who gradually lose the power of speech, degenerate into gorillas and are shot by the African explorer du Chaillu. He refers to the movement to end slavery in mentioning that one of the gorillas shot by du Chaillu "remembered that his ancestors had once been men, and tried to say, 'Am I Not A Man And A Brother?', but had forgotten how to use his tongue".

The Water Babies alludes to debates among biologists of its day, satirising what Kingsley had previously dubbed the "great hippocampus question" as the "great hippopotamus test". At various times the text refers to "Sir Roderick Murchison, Professor (Richard) Owen, Professor (Thomas Henry) Huxley, (and) Mr. Darwin", and thus they become explicitly part of the story. In the accompanying illustrations by Linley Sambourne, Huxley and Owen are caricatured, studying a captured water baby. In 1892 Thomas Henry Huxley's five-year-old grandson Julian saw this engraving and wrote his grandfather a letter asking:

Dear Grandpater – Have you seen a Waterbaby? Did you put it in a bottle? Did it wonder if it could get out? Could I see it some day? – Your loving Julian.

Huxley wrote back a letter (later evoked by the New York Suns "Yes, Virginia, there is a Santa Claus" in 1897):

My dear Julian – I could never make sure about that Water Baby.
I have seen Babies in water and Babies in bottles; the Baby in the water was not in a bottle and the Baby in the bottle was not in water. My friend who wrote the story of the Water Baby was a very kind man and very clever. Perhaps he thought I could see as much in the water as he did. – There are some people who see a great deal and some who see very little in the same things.
When you grow up I dare say you will be one of the great-deal seers, and see things more wonderful than the Water Babies where other folks can see nothing.

Adaptations
The book was adapted into an animated film The Water Babies in 1978 starring James Mason, Bernard Cribbins and Billie Whitelaw. Though many of the main elements are there, the film's storyline differs substantially from the book, with a new sub-plot involving Tom saving the Water-Babies from imprisonment by a kingdom of sharks.

It was also adapted into a musical theatre version produced at the Garrick Theatre in London, in 1902. The adaptation was described as a "fairy play", by Rutland Barrington, with music by Frederick Rosse, Albert Fox, and Alfred Cellier. The book was also produced as a play by Jason Carr and Gary Yershon, mounted at the Chichester Festival Theatre in 2003, directed by Jeremy Sams, starring Louise Gold, Joe McGann, Katherine O'Shea, and Neil McDermott.

The story was also adapted into a radio series featuring Timothy West, Julia McKenzie, and Oliver Peace as Tom.

A 2013 update for BBC Radio 4 brought the tale to a newer age, with Tomi having been trafficked from Nigeria as a child labourer.

In 2014 it was adapted into a musical; a shortened version premiered at the Edinburgh Fringe Festival in 2014, with the full version being produced at the Playhouse Theatre, Cheltenham in 2015 by performing arts students of the University of Gloucestershire. It was performed, again by students, in the same venue in June 2019.

In 2019 the story was adapted into a folk opera performed at The Sydney Fringe Australia from a musical score and libretto composed by musician and librettist Freddie Hill in 1999.

Notes

References

 (contains The Autobiography of Charles Darwin)

External links
 

 

 
  

1863 British novels
1863 fantasy novels
1860s children's books
Anti-Catholic publications
British children's novels
British fantasy novels
British satirical novels
Novels by Charles Kingsley
British novels adapted into films
Novels adapted into radio programs
British novels adapted into plays
Novels first published in serial form
Works originally published in Macmillan's Magazine
Charles Darwin
Criticism of creationism
Antisemitic novels